Frosti Sigurjónsson (born December 19, 1962 in Reykjavík) is an Icelandic businessman and politician. He was a member of parliament for the Progressive Party from 2013 to 2016.

Frosti has an MBA from the London Business School (1991). He has had prominent roles in various Icelandic companies. From 1999 to 2005 he served as chair of the board of CCP Games. In 2005 he co-founded the travel search engine Dohop where he served until 2010 as managing director and then as CEO. He was also co-founder and from 2009 to 2013 CEO of DataMarket, a company active in the field of information visualization.

Following the Icelandic parliamentary elections of April 27, 2013 Frosti was a member of the Icelandic parliament for the constituency Reykjavík North. He was Chairman of the Parliament Committee on Economic Affairs and Trade and Member of the Committee on Foreign Affairs.

Frosti Sigurjónsson announced in 2016 that he would not to stand for re-election in Iceland.

Reform of the Icelandic monetary system

In spring of 2015 Frosti Sigurjónsson was commissioned by the then Icelandic Prime Minister Sigmundur Davíð Gunnlaugsson, to find out why the financial crisis of 2008-2011 hit Iceland particularly hard. In his study Frosti concludes that the main problem lies in the creation of money on the deposit money banks. Frosti advocates monetary control by the state. This corresponds to the objectives pursued and the Association for Monetary modernization of the Swiss Hansruedi Weber.

References

External links
 Homepage
 Profile at the Icelandic parliament
 Short English profile at the Icelandic parliament

Frosti Sigurjonsson
Living people
1962 births
Frosti Sigurjonsson